Rileyville is a village in the Lebanon Township, Wayne County, Pennsylvania, United States. It is located at the intersection of Route 191 and Route 371. The mailing city address for the area is Honesdale, a borough and the county seat directly south of Rileyville.

References

Unincorporated communities in Wayne County, Pennsylvania
Unincorporated communities in Pennsylvania
Pocono Mountains